Chut, or Khut, is one of the household spirits in Belarusian mythology. He brings money, grain and success to the hosts of the house, but, not being fed, Chut could perform a cruel revenge to them.

Description 
In Belarusian language Chut has masculine grammatical gender – that's why in most cases Chut is described as a male. Chut is the polymorphous spirit: he could look like little boy or dwarf; he is also able to take the form of inanimate objects — gnarled piece of wood, old wheel, dry stump and so on. Chut appears in the houses, where perverted daughter of host killed her illegitimate child or tried to raise him or she without baptism. Belarusians believe, that the soul of this child transforms into Chut. Chut saves the childish features of character forever: he is foolish, playful, joking and emotionally labile. This spirit likes to make fun of the guests: to hide somebody's hat, to spill the beans and peas (and then gather them again at night).

Belarusians usually eat such kind of food on weddings, baptism, Kupala Night, Trinity Holiday and young women rituals. The host uses special words to invite Chut to take the meal: "Chut, Chut, come here! I'll give You fried eggs and abaranki!".

See also 

 Domovoy
 Brownie

References 

Slavic mythology

Slavic household deities